Tormented is a 1960 American horror film directed and produced by Bert I. Gordon for Allied Artists Pictures Corporation, and starring Richard Carlson. The film was featured in the fourth season of the television series Mystery Science Theater 3000.

Plot 

Jazz pianist Tom Stewart lives in a Cape Cod island community, and is preparing to marry his fiancée Meg Hubbard. Shortly before the wedding, Tom's ex-girlfriend Vi Mason visits and informs him that she will end his relationship with Meg, using blackmail if necessary. While they argue atop a lighthouse, the railing gives way, and Vi falls, managing to hang on briefly. She cries out for help but Tom refuses and watches her fall to her death.

The next day, Tom sees Vi's body floating in the water. After retrieving her, the body dissolves into seaweed. Tom tries to forget, but over the next few days, Vi's watch washes up on the beach, strange footprints appear in the sand, Vi's ghost appears and tells Tom that she will haunt him for the rest of his life, and when Meg's little sister Sandy asks to see the wedding ring, a disembodied hand makes off with it.

Soon afterward, during a wedding party, Vi's disembodied head appears in a photo a guest takes of the couple. Later, Vi taunts that she will now use her voice to tell the world how he killed her. To add to Tom's dilemma, a beatnik ferryman comes looking, intent on collecting the $5 Vi owes for her passage to the island. Tom's haste to pay only causes the shifty man to stick around, and his attempts at blackmail lead to his death. Unbeknownst to Tom, Sandy has inadvertently witnessed the murder.

Sandy remains silent, although she almost speaks up at the wedding when the minister asks if anyone has any objection. Before she can speak, the church's doors burst open and causes the flowers to wilt and the candles to die, bringing the ceremony to an abrupt, unpleasant halt.

That night, Tom returns to the lighthouse and tells Vi that he is leaving the island. When he finds Sandy eavesdropping, he realizes that he is trapped: Sandy knows too much and could tell Meg and the community. In desperation, Tom leads Sandy up to the broken railing with the intent to push her over. However, Vi's ghost swoops down on him, causing him to go over the edge as Sandy watches.

The islanders search for Tom's body; they find Vi's, and Tom's soon afterward and placed next to Vi, which somehow manages to turn and lay its arm across him. On Vi's hand is the wedding ring, signaling that Tom is now forever with Vi.

Cast
Richard Carlson as Tom Stewart
Susan Gordon as Sandy Hubbard
Lugene Sanders as Meg Hubbard
Juli Reding as Vi Mason
Joe Turkel as Nick
Lillian Adams as Mrs. Ellis
Gene Roth as Mr. Nelson 
Vera Marsh as Mrs. Hubbard
Harry Fleer as Frank Hubbard
Paul Frees (uncredited) as Frank's voice

Production notes 
Nick, the "beatnik ferryman", was played by Joe Turkel, who appeared in two other Gordon productions: The Boy and the Pirates and Village of the Giants.

While the role of Frank Hubbard was portrayed on screen by actor Harry Fleer, his voice was dubbed by Paul Frees. This was a common occurrence in Frees' career as he was often called in to dub actors' voices during the post-production phases, always in an uncredited capacity.

Home media 
 Something Weird Video released the film as a download.
 The MST3K version has been released by Rhino Home Video as part of the Collection, Volume XI box set.

See also
 List of ghost films
 List of films in the public domain in the United States
 The Uninvited

References

External links 

 
 
 
 
 MST3K episode on ShoutFactoryTV

1960 films
1960 horror films
1960s ghost films
Allied Artists films
American black-and-white films
American ghost films
American independent films
Films directed by Bert I. Gordon
Films scored by Albert Glasser
Films set on islands
Works set in lighthouses
1960s English-language films
1960s American films